Abul Khair was a Bangladeshi television and film actor. He won Bangladesh National Film Award for Best Supporting Actor four times for his roles in the films Dahan (1985), Rajlakshmi Srikanta (1987), Anya Jibon (1995) and Dukhai (1997).

Career
Khair's acting career started in the mid 1950s . Later in life when he again started  performing in television he acted in many Humayun Ahmed's television drama and film drama serial Ei Shob Din Ratri. He later acted in Bohubrihi, Aaj Robibar, Ayomoy and others.

Besides being an actor on television and movies, he also held several executive positions domestically and internationally as follows:
 Director of Films, Ministry of Information of the then Government of East Pakistan and later on Government of Bangladesh during 1968 to 1976.
 During that time he got permission from Pakistan government to go to India to Directed documentary on now National Poet Kazi Nazrul Islam (The Rebel Poet) in 1970.
 He orchestrated and directed the 7 March speech of Bangabandhu Sheikh Mujibur Rahman (the only copy was restored and saved by him during the war).
 He also made documentary on Bangladesh "This is Bangladesh" which was shown at the Montreal World Film Festival (1977)
 Managing Director of FDC (Film Development Corporation) during 1973 to 1975
 International Film Director, United Nations, New York City, United States during 1976 to 1980. In this capacity, he made many documentary movies on human habitat in Sri Lanka, Canada, Bangladesh, India and Pakistan. He directed the documentary "The Big Village" for UN which is in the Bangladesh Film Archive and as well as the UN film archive.

Works

Television
 Ei Shob Din Ratri
 Kothao Keu Nei
 Bohubrihi
 Aaj Robibar (1999)
 Ayomoy
 Nimful (1997)
 Shobinoy Nibedon (1965)

Film

References

External links
 

Bangladeshi male film actors
Bangladeshi male television actors
Best Supporting Actor National Film Award (Bangladesh) winners
Place of birth missing
Place of death missing
Date of birth missing
Date of death missing